Kasahara is a Japanese surname. Notable people with the surname include:

Erika Kasahara (born 1990), Japanese taekwondo practitioner 
Hiroko Kasahara (born 1970), Japanese voice actress and J-pop singer 
Kazuo Kasahara (1927–2002), Japanese screenwriter 
Kenji Kasahara (born 1975), Japanese entrepreneur 
Kasahara Kenju (1852–1883), Japanese Buddhologist and Indologist 
Kunihiko Kasahara (born 1941), Japanese origami master 
Momona Kasahara (born 2003), Japanese pop singer 
Rumi Kasahara (born 1970), Japanese voice actress 
Shigeru Kasahara (born 1933), Japanese wrestler 
, Japanese hammer thrower
Shoki Kasahara (born 1991), Japanese baseball player 
Shotaro Kasahara (born 1995), Japanese baseball player 
Sota Kasahara (born 1976), Japanese football player 
Sunao Kasahara (born 1989), Japanese football player 
Takashi Kasahara (footballer, born 1918), Japanese football player 
Takashi Kasahara (footballer, born 1988), Japanese football player goalkeeper 
Tokushi Kasahara (born 1944), Japanese historian 
Yōko Kasahara (born 1939), Japanese volleyball player 
Yukio Kasahara (1889–1988), leading general in the Imperial Japanese Army 
Yuri Kasahara, Japanese opera singer 

Japanese-language surnames